Gary Tredrea (born 6 October 1951) is a former Australian rules footballer and current assistant coach of Port Adelaide in the SANFL. He is the father of Port Adelaide Power champion, Warren Tredrea.

VFL/SANFL career

Collingwood career
Originally from Reservoir, the half forward flanker played 19 games and kicked 6 goals for Collingwood between 1970 and 1972.

Port Adelaide career
He was going to move to Queensland but instead moved to South Australia where he played for the Port Adelaide Magpies in the SANFL. He made his SANFL debut in the 1973 season, playing approximately 70 games with Port and West Adelaide before his premature retirement due to a knee injury.

Coaching career
Tredrea has been a fixture with both the SANFL and AFL arms of the Port Adelaide Football Club since his playing retirement, coaching junior and reserves grades before returning to the Magpies as assistant coach to Tim Ginever for season 2008.

Personal life
Tredrea currently lives in Port Adelaide.

References

Holmesby, Russell and Main, Jim (2007). The Encyclopedia of AFL Footballers. 7th ed. Melbourne: Bas Publishing.

Living people
Australian rules footballers from Victoria (Australia)
Collingwood Football Club players
Port Adelaide Football Club (SANFL) players
Port Adelaide Football Club players (all competitions)
1951 births